Atomotricha exsomnis is a moth in the family Oecophoridae first described by Edward Meyrick in 1913. It is endemic to New Zealand.

References

Moths described in 1913
Oecophoridae
Moths of New Zealand
Endemic fauna of New Zealand
Taxa named by Edward Meyrick
Endemic moths of New Zealand